Igor Chzhan (born 2 October 1999) is a Kazakh cyclist, who currently rides for UCI WorldTeam .

Major results
2016
 3rd Road race, National Junior Road Championships
2017
 Asian Junior Road Championships
1st  Time trial
2nd  Road race
 1st Overall Tour de DMZ
1st Stage 3
 2nd Time trial, National Junior Road Championships
 5th Time trial, UCI Junior Road World Championships
 5th Overall Trophée Centre Morbihan
2018
 2nd Time trial, National Road Championships
2019
 1st Stage 4 Tour of Iran (Azerbaijan)
 2nd Overall Tour of Peninsular
2022
 Asian Road Championships
1st  Road race
1st  Team time trial
 1st Grand Prix Velo Alanya
 6th Grand Prix Gündoğmuş
 7th Grand Prix Mediterranean
 8th Grand Prix Velo Manavgat

References

External links

1999 births
Living people
Kazakhstani male cyclists
People from Taldykorgan
20th-century Kazakhstani people
21st-century Kazakhstani people